The Lord of the Rings: The Fellowship of the Ring: Original Motion Picture Soundtrack was released on 20 November 2001. It was composed, orchestrated, and conducted by Howard Shore, and performed by the London Philharmonic Orchestra, the New Zealand Symphony Orchestra, the London Voices, London Oratory School Schola choir and multiple featured instrumental and vocal soloists.

The album is a reduction of over three and a half hours of finalized music written for The Fellowship of the Ring. The music on the album features edited-down compositions to create a concert-like listening experience, many of which are based on earlier drafts of the composition, written as the film was being edited. A prime example is the opening track, "The Prophecy", which does not contain the version of the main theme that opens the other albums ("The History of the Ring" motif). This was because the filmmakers intended to film a shorter prologue sequence (which a version of this track accompanied), but the idea was eventually dropped in favour of a more detailed and engaging sequence. The front cover for this CD was available in various designs.

Reception

Critical reception 

The Fellowship of the Ring received critical acclaim from music critics and won the Academy Award for Best Original Score, the Grammy Award for Best Score Soundtrack Album, and the World Soundtrack Award for Best Original Soundtrack.

Commercial performance 

In the United Kingdom, the album peaked at number ten on the UK Albums Chart. As of December 2014, the album has sold 276,912 copies in the UK.

Track listing 

Enya's songs are nestled inside Shore's music (neither of the two songs has an isolated track) and is accompanied by his music, performed by the London Philharmonic and London Voices. Enya went on to release a longer, alternate version of the song "Aníron", on The Very Best of Enya.

Charts and certifications

Weekly charts

Year-end charts

Certifications

Complete recordings and additional music 

In 2005, Reprise Records released a multi-disc set for the film, titled The Complete Recordings. These contain the entire score for the extended versions of the films on CD, along with an additional DVD-Audio disc that offers 2.0 stereo and 5.1 surround mixes of the soundtrack. Unlike the other two "Complete Recording" albums, this one was originally conceived as an "isolated score" of sorts, and therefore retains several loops and tracked pieces of music from the film, and omits pieces that were used in their stead or removed from the film.

The album also featured extensive liner notes by music journalist Doug Adams which reviews all of the tracks and provides information about the process of composing and recording the score, as well as a detailed list of all musical instruments, people and organizations involved. The cover artwork uses the film series' logo and an inscription in Tolkien's tengwar letters, over a background that depicts the Shire, Rhudaur and Eregion in dark red.

 Track listing

Additional music 
Additional music for the film was featured in The Rarities Archive release, attached to Doug Adams' book on the three film scores:Along with about 20 minutes of alternate material from the original release, about 13 minutes of alternates in the fan credits, and some additional alternates, there are almost four hours of finalized music from Fellowship of the Ring.

References 

2001 soundtrack albums
2000s film soundtrack albums
Classical music soundtracks
The Lord of the Rings (film series) music
Howard Shore soundtracks
Scores that won the Best Original Score Academy Award